Jean-Jacques Kieffer (1857 in Guinkirchen – 1925 in Bitche) was a French naturalist and entomologist who specialised in the study of parasitic insects. Educated as a priest, Kieffer taught natural science in Bitche, Lorraine while working on the description and classification of insects. His work and publications later became a predominant source of description  and classification for entomologists in the early 20th century, in particular with regard to parasitoid wasps, midges, and mosquitos.

He collaborated with the English entomologist Peter Cameron.

Kieffer received an honorary Doctor honoris causa degree from the University of Strasbourg in 1904.

Selected publications
Monographie des Cécidomyides d’Europe et d’Algérie. Annales de la Société Entomologique de France 69: 181–472, pl. 15–44. 1900
Synopsis des Zoocécidies d’Europe. Annales de la Société Entomologique de France 70: 233–579. 1901
Beschreibung neuer Proctotrypiden und Evaniiden. Arkiv for Zoologi 1: 525–562. 1904
Description de nouveaux diapriides et belytides d'Europe. Annales de la Société scientifique de Bruxelles, 1909
Hymenoptera. Fam. Scelionidae. Addenda et corrigenda. Genera Insectorum 80: 61–112. 1910
Hymenoptera, Proctotrupoidea. Transactions of the Linnean Society of London, Zoology 15: 45–80. 1912
Proctotrupidae, Cynipidae et Evaniidae. Voyage de Ch. Alluaud et R. Jeannel en Afrique Orientale (1911–1912). Résultats scientifiques. Hyménoptères 1: 1–35. 1913
Proctotrypidae (3e partie). Pages 305–448 in André, E. Species des Hyménoptères d'Europe et d'Algérie. Vol. 11. 1914
Neue Scelioniden aus den Philippinen-Inseln. Brotéria 14: 58–187. 1916
 Diapriidae. Das Tierreich. Vol. 44. Walter de Gruyter & Co., Berlin. 1916 627 pp.
 Scelionidae. Das Tierreich. Vol. 48. Walter de Gruyter & Co., Berlin. 1926 885pp.

Collection
Kieffer did not possess a collection. Instead he worked on museum material especially on that of the Muséum national d'histoire naturelle which contains his types of the Hymenoptera families Proctotrupidae, Platygasteridae, Ceraphronidae, Diapriidae, Scelionidae, Bethylidae, Dryinidae and Embolemidae. Some other material is held by the Lycée Technique et Lycée Professionnel Henri Nominé in Sarreguemines.

Honours
A number of insect genera and species have been named for him, e.g.
 Kiefferia, a genus of gall midges
 Kiefferulus, a genus of chironomids
 Kiefferomyia, a genus of biting midges (now included in Kieffer's own genus Schizohelea)

See also
 :Category:Taxa named by Jean-Jacques Kieffer

References

External links
 Internet Archive Free download of Kieffer, J.J. 1916. Diapriidae. Das Tierreich. Eine Zusammenstellung und Kennzeichnung der rezenten Tierformen. Vol. 44.. Walter de Gruyter & Co., Berlin, 627 pp.
 Internet Archive Free download of Kieffer, J.J.A. 1914. Hymenoptera. Serphidae (= Proctotrupidae) et Calliceratidae (= Ceraphronidae). Das Tierreich. Eine Zusammenstellung und Kennzeichnung der rezenten Tierformen. R. Friedlander und Sohn, Berlin. Vol. 42: xvii + 254 pp.
 Societe d'Histoire Naturelle de la Moselle

1857 births
1925 deaths
Dipterists
French entomologists
Hymenopterists